is a Japanese television jidaigeki or period drama that was broadcast in 1981. It is the 16th in the Hissatsu series.　In 1982 the sequel drama Shin Hissatsu Shimainin (18th in the Hissatsu series) was produced by the same cast. The drama features several aikido-based action scenes choreographed by Steven Seagal under the name of 武榮道, prior to the start of his own film career.

Plot

Cast
 Machiko Kyō as Bantokyozan
 Etsushi Takahashi as Shinmatsu
 Hirotarō Honda as Naojiro
 Midori Nishizaki as Ohana

References

1981 Japanese television series debuts
1980s drama television series
Jidaigeki television series